Conway Hillyer Arnold, USN, (November 14, 1848 – July 16, 1917) was a rear admiral of the United States Navy, in command of the Third Squadron of the Atlantic Fleet in 1910.

Early life 
He was born on November 14, 1848 in New York to Commander Henry Nathan Tewkesbury and Cornelia Van Vleck Sleight.

Career 
In 1867, he graduated from the United States Naval Academy, and in 1868 was commissioned as an ensign in the United States Navy.

In 1870, Arnold was commissioned as a master.  The following year, he was promoted to the rank of Lieutenant.  After many years as a Lieutenant, Arnold was commissioned to the rank of Lieutenant Commander in 1892.

At the onset of the Spanish–American War, he was promoted to the rank of commander.  In 1902, he obtained the rank of captain.  Then, by 1908, he was promoted to the position of rear admiral and placed in charge of the Third Squadron of the Atlantic Fleet

Personal life and family 
On November 17, 1870, he married Fannie Wood of Raleigh, North Carolina, daughter of William W. W. Wood, Engineer in Chief of the United States Navy.

His son Conway Hillyer Arnold Jr., who also served with distinction in the military, died at a young age on April 6, 1908 in Denver, Colorado, possibly of tuberculosis.

Admiral Arnold was a companion of the Military Order of the Loyal Legion of the United States and a member of the Society of the Cincinnati.  He was also a member of the Military Order of the Carabao.

Death and legacy 
Arnold died on July 16, 1917 in New York City and was survived by his wife, Fannie and his two grandchildren. He was buried at Oak Hill Cemetery in Washington, D.C.

References

1848 births
1917 deaths
United States Navy rear admirals
Military personnel from New York City
United States Naval Academy alumni
Burials at Oak Hill Cemetery (Washington, D.C.)